Deepraj Gaonkar (born 4 April 1998) is an Indian cricketer. He made his first-class debut for Goa in the 2014–15 Ranji Trophy on 28 December 2014. He made his List A debut for Goa in 2018-19 Vijay Hazare Trophy on 19 September 2018.

References

External links
 

1998 births
Living people
Indian cricketers
Goa cricketers
Place of birth missing (living people)